Araeomorpha is a genus of moths of the family Crambidae.

Species
Araeomorpha diplopa (Lower, 1903)
Araeomorpha limnophila Turner, 1937

References

 , 1903: Descriptions of new Australian Noctuina, & c.. Transactions of the Royal Society South Australia, 27: 27–74.
 , 1908: New Australian Lepidoptera of the families Noctuidae and Pyralidae. Transactions of the Royal Society South Australia, 32: 55–109.
 , 1915: Studies in Australian Lepidoptera. Proceedings of the Royal Society of Queensland, 27: 11–57.
 , 1937: New Australian Pyraloidea (Lepidoptera). Proceedings of the Royal Society of Queensland, 48 (10): 61–88.

Acentropinae
Crambidae genera
Taxa named by Alfred Jefferis Turner